Lefor is an unincorporated community in southern Stark County, North Dakota, United States.  It lies southeast of the city of Dickinson, the county seat of Stark County.  Its elevation is 2,592 feet (790 m). Lefor's post office closed November 2, 2002, but the town still has its own ZIP code of 58641.

Lefor has the highest percentage of residents of Hungarian origin of any zip code in the United States.

Lefor is part of the Dickinson Micropolitan Statistical Area.

Climate
This climatic region is typified by large seasonal temperature differences, with warm to hot (and often humid) summers and cold (sometimes severely cold) winters.  According to the Köppen Climate Classification system, Lefor has a humid continental climate, abbreviated "Dfb" on climate maps.

References

External links
 Lefor, ND : GhostsofNorthDakota.com (North Dakota's Ghost Towns and Abandoned Places)
 St. Elizabeth Parish (Roman Catholic)

Unincorporated communities in Stark County, North Dakota
Unincorporated communities in North Dakota
Dickinson, North Dakota micropolitan area